Love's Gonna Happen to Me is a studio album by American country artist Wynn Stewart. His backing band, "The Tourists," received equal billing on the album release. It was released in November 1967 via Capitol Records and was produced by Ken Nelson. It was Stewart's third studio album in his career and was the second album release of 1967. The album's title track became a major hit in 1967 during the same period of the record's release.

Background and content
Love's Gonna Happen to Me was recorded in 1967 at the Capitol Recording Studio, located in Hollywood, California. The album's recording sessions were produced by Ken Nelson. Nelson was Stewart's longtime producer with Capitol through the end of the decade. He had also worked with Stewart in the 1950s when he was first signed with the label (but was later dropped and then resigned years later). Love's Gonna Happen to Me contained a total of 12 tracks. Seven of these tracks were written by Stewart himself. Songs such as "That's the Only Way to Cry," "Daddy's Girl" and "Make Big Love" were all self-composed. The track, "Down Came the World" was co-written by Waylon Jennings. Also included was a remake of "Above and Beyond (The Call of Love)," which he first recorded several years prior. Stewart's re-recording of his first Capitol hit, "Waltz of the Angels," is also featured in the album's track listing.

Release and reception

Love's Gonna Happen to Me was released in November 1967 on Capitol Records. It was Stewart's third studio album and second album release of the year. His backing band, The Tourists, received equal billing on the album. The album was issued as a Vinyl LP, containing six songs on each side of the record. Love's Gonna Happen to Me spent 11 weeks on the Billboard Top Country Albums chart and peaked at number 13 in March 1968. It was Stewart's second album to chart any Billboard survey. Although not a proper album review, Billboard magazine did give the album's sound reception in a 1967 article. In the article, writers commented that the style of Love's Gonna Happen to Me was "individualistic" compared to other performers. The album's title track was the only single release. It was issued as a single in October 1967. The song became a top ten hit in early 1968, reaching number seven on the Billboard Hot Country Singles chart in January 1968. The song was Stewart's fourth top ten hit in his music career.

Track listing

Personnel
All credits are adapted from the liner notes of Love's Gonna Happen to Me.

Musical personnel
 David Allen – drums
 Phil Baugh – guitar
 Jimmie Collins – steel guitar
 Tommy Collins – guitar
 George French – piano
 Harold Garrison – guitar
 Dennis Hromek – bass
 Roy Nichols – guitar
 Bob Pierce – piano
 Wynn Stewart – lead vocals
 Bobby Wayne – guitar

Technical personnel
 Dick Brown – cover photo
 Ken Nelson – producer

Chart performance

Release history

References

1967 albums
Albums produced by Ken Nelson (United States record producer)
Capitol Records albums
Wynn Stewart albums

Albums recorded at Capitol Studios